Mount Lawn is an unincorporated community in Greensboro Township, Henry County, Indiana.

Geography

References

Unincorporated communities in Henry County, Indiana
Unincorporated communities in Indiana